The Soap Bubble Nebula, or PN G75.5+1.7, is a planetary nebula in the constellation Cygnus, near the Crescent Nebula (NGC 6888). It was discovered by amateur astronomer Dave Jurasevich using an Astro-Physics 160 mm refractor telescope with which he imaged the nebula on June 19, 2007 and on July 6, 2008. The nebula was later independently noted and reported to the International Astronomical Union by Keith B. Quattrocchi and Mel Helm who imaged PN G75.5+1.7 on July 17, 2008. The nebula measures  in angular diameter with a central star that has a J band magnitude of 19.45.

References

External links

SkyandTelescope.com - Celestial Scenes - Soap Bubble Nebula
Planetary Nebula in the Milky Way - Soap Bubble in Space
Dave Jurasevich's website

Planetary nebulae
20080706
Cygnus (constellation)